Raphael Dominique Thoene (born 17 March 1980) is a German composer and musicologist.

Biography 

Raphael D. Thoene obtained a degree in Composition (Robert Schumann Hochschule in Düsseldorf, Germany) and Music Theory (Folkwang Hochschule in Essen, Germany). A scholarship recipient, he studied Film Scoring and Composition at the Berklee College of Music, Boston (USA). He also received a PhD in Musicology at the University of Music and Performing Arts and the University of Vienna, Austria, writing his PhD thesis on Malcolm Arnold’s symphonic music.
As a composer, orchestrator and pianist, Thoene received commissions for the Orchesterakademie NRW, the International Contemporary Music Festival Ensemblia in 2005 and the Niederrheinischer Musikherbst in 2006. He orchestrates film and theatre music, and is the author of the musical "Culture", and co-author of the chamber-opera "Der Herr Gevatter" (staged in Saarbrücken, Düsseldorf and Munich).

He is currently on faculty as a Lecturer in Music Theory at the Hochschule für Musik, Theater und Medien Hannover (Germany).

Works (a selection) 

 Brass Symphony No. I for Brass Band, opus 49
 Poèmes dramatique for chamber ensemble, opus 99, based upon the chamber-opera "Der Herr Gevatter"
 Concerto for Violin and Orchestra, opus 108
 Concertino for Trumpet and Orchestra, opus 109
 Sinfonia Concertante for String Orchestra, opus 121

Publications

External links
Official Site
Speech at Gresham College London December 2007
DDM entry on Raphael Thoene

Living people
1980 births
German musicologists
German composers
Academic staff of the Hochschule für Musik, Theater und Medien Hannover